Kenton Valley is a locality named for a valley located between Gumeracha and Lobethal, about  east of Adelaide, South Australia. It is located in the Adelaide Hills Council local government area.

The area contains cherry and strawberry farms and a golf course. It is sparsely populated, and residents rely on nearby Gumeracha for educational and commercial services.

The town developed on a parcel of land taken up by the South Australian Company. The first manager of the station was William Beavis Randell who named a home he built, Kenton Park, after his home town in Devon.

The Kenton Valley Post Office operated from 1873 to 1973. The school operated from 1904 to 1943.

See also

List of valleys of Australia

References

Valleys of South Australia